Harappan may refer to: 
 Aspects related to Harappa, an archaeological site (c. 3300–1600 BC) and city in Punjab in northeast Pakistan
 The Indus Valley civilisation or Harappan civilisation, a Bronze Age civilisation that throve along Indus River c. 3300 – c. 1700 BC
 Harappan architecture of the ancient Indus Valley civilisation of Harappa